Mozu may refer to:

Geography
Mozu (Bull-headed shrike) Japanese bird:
Mozu kofungun (百舌鳥 古墳群) tombs in Sakai, Osaka Prefecture
Mozu Station (百舌鳥 駅, Mozu-eki) railway station on the Hanwa Line in Sakai-ku, Sakai, Osaka Prefecture
Nakamozu Station

Entertainment
Mozu (novels), by Go Osaka
Mozu (TV series) Japanese police television drama series  2014
Mozu (film), 2015 Japanese suspense action film

See also
Mozi (墨子) Chinese philosopher